Rear Admiral John Harold Adams,  (19 December 1918 – 3 November 2008) was a Royal Navy officer who was best known for his command of , a 22,000 ton Centaur-class light aircraft carrier, during the Indonesia–Malaysia confrontation.

Early life
He attended Glenalmond College in Perth and Kinross, Scotland and joined the Royal Navy as a special entry cadet in 1936.

Naval career
After the outbreak of the Second World War, Adams was assigned to the destroyer . On 11 September 1939, Walker ran down and went through her sister ship, and was jammed in her. As the weather and conditions were good, both ships were able to be saved. During the crisis, Adams carried Vanquishers safe with its confidential material inside to the deck of Walker, but found that after the situation had calmed down the next morning that he was unable to lift it.

He underwent training and qualified as a torpedo and electrics specialist in 1943, and was able to use this knowledge to prepare escorts for convoys crossing the North Atlantic. On 15 December 1942 he was Mentioned in Despatches for his actions aboard Cleveland in an engagement with E-Boats.

After the war, he commanded the destroyer  and served in the Admiralty's torpedo and anti-submarine warfare division, among other staff appointments. He was promoted to lieutenant commander on 1 June 1948, and commander on 31 December 1950. He was then appointed the executive commander of the Royal Yacht Britannia, which included taking Princess Margaret to the West Indies, Queen Elizabeth II to Portugal and a world tour for Prince Philip, Duke of Edinburgh, serving from 1954 to 1957. As a result, he was appointed a Member of the Fourth Class of the Royal Victorian Order in the 1957 Queen's Birthday Honours. He was promoted captain on 31 December 1956.

Adams commanded  from May 1964 to January 1966. The ship was deployed in the Indian Ocean and the Far East. She arrived east of Suez with 848 Naval Air Squadron and a strong force of Royal Marines. During the Indonesia–Malaysia confrontation, Albion sent two flights of Wessex helicopters to support marine and army border patrols from bases in Borneo and Sarawak. He was promoted rear admiral on 7 January 1966.

In 1966, serving as Assistant Chief of Naval Staff (Policy), Adams was assigned to the Ministry of Defence and became chairman of the Future Fleet Working Party, reporting to Admiral of the Fleet Sir Varyl Begg. Building on his experience with the Albion, Adams' working party recommended a "through-deck cruiser" that would carry vertical take-off jet fighters and deploy helicopters, insisting that this approach was the logical conclusion of his research. Begg, who believed that missiles would replace planes, exploded with anger and rejected Adams's report publicly. Begg told him that he would never be employed again. Adams retired on 12 February 1968, and was appointed a Companion of the Order of the Bath (CB) in that year's Queen's Birthday Honours, but was invited to the launch of the aircraft carrier  in 1977, which was a vindication of his approach.

Company director and later life
After leaving the Royal Navy, Adams served as Director of the Paper and Paper Products Industry Training Board from 1968 to 1971. From 1972 to 1973, he was Director of the Employers' Federation of Papermakers and Boardmakers and then served from 1974 to 1983 as Director General of the British Paper and Board Industry Federation.

Adams was the author of The Adventure of Charlie the Cone, stories about a traffic cone that he made up for his children during long car trips.

He married the former Mary Parker in 1943. The two had one son and the marriage ended in 1961. He married Ione Eadie later in 1961 and had two sons and two daughters together.

References

External links
 Royal Navy (RN) Officers 1939–1945
The Papers of Rear-Admiral John Adams at Churchill Archives Centre

1918 births
2008 deaths
Military personnel from Newcastle upon Tyne
Royal Navy rear admirals
British military personnel of the Indonesia–Malaysia confrontation
Royal Navy officers of World War II
People educated at Glenalmond College
Companions of the Order of the Bath
Lieutenants of the Royal Victorian Order